Pallikkara may refer to:

 Pallikkara, Bekal, a village in Kasaragod district, India
 Pallikkara, Payyoli, a village in Kozhikode district, India